Izmarukhovo is a rural locality (a village) in Pokrovskoye Rural Settlement, Velikoustyugsky District, Vologda Oblast, Russia. The population was 96 as of 2002.

Geography 
The distance to Veliky Ustyug is 43 km, to Ilyinskoye is 13 km.

References 

Rural localities in Velikoustyugsky District